Afzal Yusuf is an Indian music composer who has made his mark in the South Indian film industry with his mellifluous melodies. Being a visually challenged musician, he has given life to many songs that are familiar to all the music lovers around the world. His music compositions have earned their way onto the hit lists of various Malayalam movies which comprise Calendar, (2009), Bombay March 12 (2011), Immanuel (2013), God for Sale (2013), Mailanchi Monjulla Veedu (2014), Theeram (2017), Engeyum Naan Irupen (2017) etc.

He debuted into the film industry through the Malayalam movie Chandranilekulla Vazhi which got released in 2008. Many well-known singers have lent their voices to his songs such as Dr. K J Yesudas, P Jayachandran, Sadhana Sargam, Usha Uthup, Sonu Nigam, Shreya Ghoshal, Armaan Malik, Kailash Kher, Haricharan, Ranjith Govind, Shweta Mohan and so on. He has also contributed his share into the Tamil music industry through the movie ‘Engeyum Naan Irupen’ which is set to release soon in 2017, along with his Malayalam movie ‘Theeram’.

Career
Afzal Yusuf started his music career as a keyboard live artist which earned him the chance to work alongside several celebrated musicians, namely, Raveendran, Berny-Ignatius, Ouseppachan, Bijipal etc. Though he had worked with many popular musicians, his early associations were mainly done with the music director Bijipal and those years as a keyboard programmer had given him numerous opportunities to work on various blockbusters alongside famous musicians and film makers.

The major turning point in his life happened in the year 2004 through an event staged by SRVC (Society for the Rehabilitation of the Visually Challenged) at Le Meridian, Cochin as a part of one of their campaigns. The stage event was directed by the movie director Lal Jose and the  title song was composed by Afzal Yusuff. As the programme was rich with many notable personalities, it unlocked a door of possibilities for him to grow as a musician in the film industry.

In 2008, he debuted into the Malayalam film industry with his composition for the movie ‘Chandranilekulla Vazhi’. Afzal Yusuff has composed a number of songs for films, namely, Calendar (2009), Bombay March 12 (2011), Immanuel (2013), Ithu Pathiramanal (2013), God For Sale (2013), Mailanchi Monjulla Veedu (2014), Theeram (2017), Engeyum Naan Irupen (2017) etc. Apart from composing soul-stirring melodies that make his listeners croon, he has also been credited for introducing many great singers from Bollywood and other industries into Mollywood. Afzal Yusuff was the one who introduced singers like Sonu Nigam, Armaan Malik etc. into Malayalam movie industry who all rendered their debut songs under his composition. He has had the good fortune to collaborate with many famed movie makers including Lal Jose, Padma Kumar etc. which earned him many laurels for his compositions across the movie industry.

Afzal Yusuff is the first visually challenged Keralite who went on to become a noted music composer in Mollywood, regardless of his limitations which never stood as a hurdle before his love and passion towards music. His name had been nominated and considered for many awards and accolades which include Kerala State Special Jury mention in the year 2013 for the movies Immanuel and God For Sale, Best Music Director Award in Cera Music Awards held by 92.7 Big FM for the movies Immauel and Pathiramanal in 2013 etc.

His upcoming works are Theeram and Engeyum Naan Irupen which were released in 2017.

Awards
 2013 - Kerala State Film Award – Special Mention for Music Direction (Movies : Immanuel & God for Sale)
 2013- CERA BIG Malayalam Music Awards (92.7 BIG FM) - Best contribution in Music Direction (Movies : Immanuel & Pathiramanal)
 2013 - Thikkurushi Foundation Award - Popular Music Director (Movie : Immanuel)

Discography

References

External links

Living people
Indian Muslims
Indian male composers
Malayalam film score composers
Blind musicians
Male film score composers
Year of birth missing (living people)